Acrobasis khachella is a species of snout moth in the genus Acrobasis. It was described by Hans Georg Amsel in 1950. It is found in Iran.

References

Moths described in 1950
Acrobasis
Moths of Asia